Trendall Crag is a mountain crag, 1,005 m, overlooking the north side of Drygalski Fjord at the southeast end of South Georgia. Surveyed by the South Georgia Survey the period 1951-57 under Duncan Carse, and named for Alec Trendall, geologist of the SGS, 1951–52 and 1953–54.

Mountains and hills of South Georgia